Nixtun-Chʼichʼ is an Itza Maya archaeological site in Petén Department, Guatemala. It has an urban grid with fairly well ordered streets and avenues dated to around 2500 years ago. This is one of the earliest urban grids in the Americas and likely emerged as the ancient Maya developed more complex forms of political organization. It was likely a means to regulate and perhaps dominate the inhabitants. Nevertheless, the grid system at Nixtun-Chʼichʼ did not catch on and is not seen in later Maya cities.

Location 
Nixtun-Chʼichʼ stands on the western edge of Lake Petén Itzá. It is bordered by the lake to the south and east; by karstic hills to the north; and uneven terrain to the west. The area of the site is relatively flat, but it was built upon a low ridge that extends east to west. Maya sites are generally dispersed, but Nixtun-Chʼichʼ was laid out with an urban grid. It also includes an axis urbis composed of a row of over 15 buildings extending east to west. The axis and grid were established in the Middle Preclassic period (800-400 BC). The site also has major construction in the Late Preclassic period (400 BC-AD 200) after which the site appears to have suffered a decline—a trend seen in many sites in central Petén. The site was also occupied in the Late Classic through the Colonial period (AD 600-1734).

San Jerónimo Mission, Petén, Guatemala

Preclassic period 
During the 1995, 2006-2008, and 2013-2014 seasons at Nixtun-Chʼich, Proyecto Itza encountered Preclassic period (ca.1000 BC-AD 200) constructions in nearly every test unit excavated. It was clear that the site's most substantial constructions occurred before AD 200. In 2013-2014, Proyecto Itza remapped the site and found that it contained an urban grid. In 2015, Proyecto Itza began to intensively investigate the Preclassic period occupations along with its work on the Postclassic period.

Late postclassic and colonial period 

Postclassic and Colonial period settlements have been found at Nixtun-Chʼichʼ in Sector QQ (Middle to Late Postclassic period), Sector WW (Middle to Late Postclassic period), Sector XX (Contact or Colonial period), and Sector ZZ (Colonial period). See map below.

Underwater Archaeology 

In 2015, Proyecto Itza initiated a program of underwater archaeology on Lake Petén Itzá and began sampling in 2018. The goal of this work is to discern deposits in the lake left as offerings or accidentally dropped into the lake as a result of trade. Proyecto Itza has identified several areas that "look like" ports at Nixtun-Chʼichʼ and we will test this hypothesis though underwater sampling.

Nixtun Chʼichʼ documentary 
In 2017, Proyecto Itza began filming a documentary about the development of city planning and the state at Nixtun-Chʼichʼ.

News Coverage

Media Coverage, 2015 

 ARCHAEOLOGY: World Roundup 
 NATIONAL GEOGRAPHIC ESPAÑA: El plano en cuadrícula para controlar a la población
 NBC NEWS: Archaeologists Find Ancient Maya City With a Modern Grid Layout
 LIVE SCIENCE: Bloody Ancient Arrowhead Reveals Maya 'Life Force' Ceremony
 INTERNATIONAL BUSINESS TIMES: Ancient Mayan city layout followed grid pattern 'indicating powerful ruler'
 LIVE SCIENCE:  Early Urban Planning: Ancient Mayan City Built on Grid
 HYPERALLERGIC: Archaeologist Discovers Ancient Mayan City Built on a Grid
 ARCHAEOLOGY AIA: "Shiny" Maya City Was Laid Out on a Grid
 PRENSA LIBRE: Revelan nuevos detalles de la ciudad maya de Nixtun-Chʼichʼ
 ODISHA SUN TIMES: Ancient Mayan city unearthed
 MUNDO CHAPIN: Arqueólogos encuentran nuevas pistas en Nixtun-Chʼichʼ, Petén
 Przed Kolumbem: Nietypowy plan majańskiego miasta Nixtun Chʼichʼ (Peten, Gwatemala)

Media Coverage, 2014 

 Pugh Interview with RFCUNY
 Prensa Libre: Hallan cementerio colonial itzá
 Cultural Entanglements: Early Globalization in the Americas
 National Geographic Espana: Sacan a la luz dos alt ares mayas en Guatemala
 Ancient Mayan Altars, Sculpted Artwork Discovered in Guatemala 
 Maya Council House Unearthed in Guatemala.
 Ancient Maya Altars, Sculpted Artwork Found in Guatemala 
Ancient Maya Altars, Artwork Discovered in Guatemala
Archaeologist Discusses New Maya Ruins Uncovered in Guatemala
Ancient Mayan altars, sculpted artwork discovered in Guatemala
Χώρος τελετών των Μάγια ανακαλύφθηκε στη Γουτεμάλα
Znaleziono 'unieważnioną' majańską siedzibę władz
Tiết lộ mới nhất về tòa nhà hội đồng của người Maya

References 

Chan Nieto, Evelyn, Erdozain A. López, Sulma Cortez Avila, Timothy Pugh, and José Rómulo Sánchez 2012 El  Preclásico Tardío en la Zona de los Lagos Petén, Guatemala. In XXV Simposio de Investigaciones Arqueologías en Guatemala, 2011, edited by Bárbara Arroyo, Lorena Paiz, and Héctor Mejía.  Instituto de Antropología e Historia, Ministerio de Cultura y Deportes, and the Asociación Tikal, Guatemala City.
Pugh, Timothy W. and José Rómulo Sánchez 2012 Arqueologia Historica en la Zona de los Lagos del Petén. In XXV Simposio de Investigaciones Arqueologías en Guatemala, 2011, edited by Bárbara Arroyo, Lorena Paiz, and Héctor Mejía.  Instituto de Antropología e Historia, Ministerio de Cultura y Deportes, and la Asociación Tikal, Guatemala City.
Pugh, Timothy W., Katherine Miller, Carolyn Freiwald, and Prudence Rice 2016 Technologies of Domination at Mission San Bernabé, Petén, Guatemala. Ancient Mesoamerica 27(1):49-70.
Pugh, Timothy W. and Prudence M. Rice 2017 Early Urban Planning, Spatial Strategies, and the Maya Gridded City of Nixtun-Chʼichʼ, Petén, Guatemala. Current Anthropology 58(5):576-603.
Pugh, Timothy W., Prudence Rice, Evelyn Chan Nieto, and Don Rice 2016 A Chakʼan Itza Center at Nixtun-Chʼichʼ, Petén, Guatemala. Journal of Field Archaeology 41(1):1-16.

Further reading 

 Freiwald, Carolyn and Timothy W. Pugh 2018 The origins of early Colonial Cows at San Bernabé, Guatemala: Strontium isotope values at an early Spanish mission in the Petén Lakes region of northern Guatemala. Environmental Archaeology: The Journal of Human Paleoecology 23(1):278-284.
 Rice, Prudence and Timothy W. Pugh 2017 Water, centering, and the beginning of time at Middle Preclassic Nixtun-Chʼichʼ, Petén, Guatemala. Journal of Anthropological Archaeology 48:1–16.

External links 

 Nixtun Chʼichʼ Artifacts and more - http://www.itzaarchaeology.com/nixtun-chich/
 More Nixtun Chʼichʼ Artifacts

See also
Tayasal (archaeological site)
Zacpeten

Maya sites in Petén Department
Former populated places in Guatemala
Maya Postclassic Period
Maya sites that survived the end of the Classic Period